"Is It Raining at Your House" is a song co-written and recorded by American country music artist Vern Gosdin.  It was released in December 1990 as the second single from his compilation album 10 Years of Greatest Hits, but originally appeared on his 1987 album Chiseled in Stone.  The song reached number 10 on the Billboard Hot Country Singles & Tracks chart; it was Gosdin's last top 10 and top 40 single on the country charts.  Gosdin wrote the song with Dean Dillon and Hank Cochran.

Content
The song is in the key of D major. The first verse follows the chord pattern of D-Fm/Cm-G/B-A-D twice, followed by D-Fm-G/B-Gm/B-D-Bm-D/A-G-G/A-D. After this single verse is a bridge following the chord pattern Bm-F-Gm6. In the song, a male narrator asks his former lover if it is "raining at [her] house".

Chart performance

Year-end charts

Cover versions
Jamey Johnson covered the song on his 2002 self-released album They Call Me Country.
Brad Paisley covered the song on his 2003 album Mud on the Tires.
Lorrie Morgan covered the song on her 2016 album Letting Go...Slow. Morgan's cover features sound effects of rain and thunder fading into the song's beginning, and again fading out at the song's end.

References

1990 singles
Vern Gosdin songs
Jamey Johnson songs
Brad Paisley songs
Lorrie Morgan songs
Songs written by Hank Cochran
Songs written by Dean Dillon
Songs written by Vern Gosdin
Song recordings produced by Bob Montgomery (songwriter)
Columbia Records singles
1987 songs